Polygrammodes tessallalis is a moth in the family Crambidae. It was described by Max Gaede in 1917. It is found in Cameroon.

References

Spilomelinae
Moths described in 1917
Moths of Africa